Gordon Clay Seyfried (born July 4, 1937) is a retired American professional baseball player. He attended Wilson Classical High School and Long Beach City College.

Seyfried was signed by the Detroit Tigers in 1956. In 1964, The Sporting News said his number one pitch was a slider. However, other sources say he threw a knuckleball. In the minor leagues, he won over 100 games, leading the Eastern League in wins in 1958, with 17, while playing for the Lancaster Red Roses. From 1960–1962, as a member of the Triple-A Denver Bears, he posted a combined won–lost record of 40–24. On November 27, 1962, Seyfried was traded with fellow hurler Ron Nischwitz to the Cleveland Indians for veteran third baseman Bubba Phillips.

After spending the 1963 minor league season at Triple-A, Seyfried made his MLB debut on September 13, 1963, against the Los Angeles Angels at Dodger Stadium, only a few miles up the freeway from his Long Beach home town. Relieving Early Wynn, Seyfried pitched one inning and allowed two hits and no runs before being lifted for a pinch hitter; Cleveland prevailed in 12 innings, 7–6, with Gary Bell getting the win. In the third and final game of his 1963 late-season trial, Seyfried received his only big-league start. Facing the Kansas City Athletics at Municipal Stadium, Seyfried allowed only one earned run in 5 innings, but departed the game trailing 2–1; when Cleveland could not rally from behind, Seyfried was tagged with the loss in his only MLB decision. In 1964, Seyfried worked in two scoreless April relief appearances for the Indians, before returning to Triple-A. He retired as a pitcher in mid-1967, and spent the remainder of that season as the manager of the Gulf Coast Indians, Cleveland's Rookie-level affiliate.

All told, in five games and 9 innings pitched in the majors, Seyfried allowed only that one earned run for a career earned run average of 0.93. He allowed 13 hits and three bases on balls. He fanned one hitter, Gino Cimoli of the Athletics, during his start on September 27, 1963.

References

External links

1937 births
Living people
Atlanta Crackers players
Baseball players from Long Beach, California
Birmingham Barons players
Cleveland Indians players
Denver Bears players
Durham Bulls players
Idaho Falls Russets players
Indianapolis Indians players
Lancaster Red Roses players
Major League Baseball pitchers
Minor league baseball managers
Portland Beavers players
Salt Lake City Bees players
Long Beach City Vikings baseball players